The 2019–20 Club Atlético Boca Juniors season was the 91st consecutive Primera División season for the senior squad. During the season, Boca Juniors took part in the Primera División, Copa de la Superliga, Copa Argentina, Final stages of the 2019 Copa Libertadores and in the Group stage of the 2020 Copa Libertadores.

Season overview

June
On 19 June Boca announced that Alexis Mac Allister is the first signing of the season, being loaned from Brighton & Hove Albion. Julián Chicco is loaned to Patronato. Gonzalo Maroni and Agustín Rossi returned from their loans in Talleres (C) and Deportes Antofagasta, and are loaned again, to Sampdoria and to Lanús. Talleres (C) made use of the option to purchase Tomás Pochettino permanently. Nicolás Benegas returned from his loan and is transferred to Defensores de Belgrano.

July
Nicolás Colazo, Franco Cristaldo, Marcelo Torres and Nazareno Solís returned from their loans. Nazareno Solís is loaned to Aldosivi and Franco Cristaldo to Central Córdoba (SdE). On 12 July, Boca and Gimnasia y Esgrima (LP) reached an agreement for the transfer of forward Jan Carlos Hurtado. On 18 July, Boca and Benfica reached an agreement for the transfer of midfielder Eduardo Salvio. The first official match of the season was a 1–0 win against Athletico Paranaense in the Round of 16 of 2019 Copa Libertadores. Italian midfielder Daniele de Rossi is new player of the club, after arriving as a free agent. He played 18 years in Roma and won the world cup with Italy. Boca draw 0–0 against Huracán in the first match of the league tournament. In the second leg of the Round of 16 of Copa Libertadores, Boca beat Athletico Paranaense 2-0 and advanced to the Quarterfinals, facing Ecuadorian team LDU Quito. Nicolás Colazo is loaned to Rosario Central.

August
On 4 August, Boca defeated Patronato 2–0. On 5 August, Boca and Marseille reached an agreement for the transfer of forward Darío Benedetto, "Pipa" leaves the club after three years, in which he scored 45 goals in 76 matches. On 8 August, forward Cristian Pavón is loaned to LA Galaxy. On 9 August, Boca and Cagliari reached an agreement for the transfer of midfielder Nahitan Nández. On 13 August, forward Franco Soldano is loaned from Olympiakos. Boca is eliminated from 2018–19 Copa Argentina after losing in penaltis against Almagro. On 18 August Boca won Aldosivi 2–0. On 21 August Boca won LDU Quito 3–0 in the first leg of the quarterfinals. On 25 August Boca defeated Banfield 1–0. In the second leg of the Quarterfinals of Copa Libertadores, Boca draw LDU Quito 0-0 and advanced to the Semifinals, facing River Plate, in another edition of Superclásico.

September
The Primera División Superclásico against River Plate ended in a 0–0 draw. On 15 September Boca won Estudiantes (LP) 1–0. On 21 September Boca won San Lorenzo 2–0. On 18 September Boca draw 1–1 against Newells.

October
The first leg of the Libertadores semifinals Superclásico ended in a 2–0 defeat against River Plate. On 6 October Boca won Defensa y Justicia 1–0. On 18 October Boca lost the first match of the Superliga, 1–0 against Racing. Boca won 1–0 against River the second leg of the Libertadores semifinals Superclásico but lost 2–1 in the aggregate and is eliminated. On 31 October Boca lost 2–1 against Lanús.

November
On 3 November Boca won Arsenal 5–1. On 10 November Boca draw 0–0 against Vélez Sarsfield. On 24 November Boca won Unión 2–0. On 30 November Boca draw 1–1 against Argentinos Juniors.

November
On 8 December Boca lost against Rosario Central 1–0, it was the last match of 2019.

December
Miguel Ángel Russo is the new head coach of the club, after Gustavo Alfaro ended his contract.

January
Leonardo Jara and Nahuel Molina returned from their loans. Kevin Mac Allister returned to his club after a loan spell in Boca. On 6 January, Daniele De Rossi announced his retirement from football. On 10 January the new uniforms are presented, with Adidas replacing Nike. On 17 January, midfielder Guillermo Fernández is loaned from Cruz Azul. Boca and Paolo Goltz agreed to mutually terminate the defender's contract, Goltz subsequently joined Gimnasia y Esgrima (LP). On 26 January the first match of the year was a 0–0 draw against Independiente. Brighton & Hove Albion recalls Alexis Mac Allister, interrupting his loan spell with Boca. On 31 January, Boca and Dynamo Kyiv reached an agreement for the transfer of defender Carlos Zambrano.

February
On 2 February Boca won Talleres (C) 2–1. On 8 February Boca won Atlético Tucumán 2–0. On 16 February Boca won Central Córdoba (SdE) 4–0. On 23 February Boca won Godoy Cruz 3–0. On 28 February Boca won Colón 4–0.

March
In the beginning of 2020 Copa Libertadores Boca draw Caracas 1-1. In the last match of Superliga Boca won Gimnasia y Esgrima (LP) 1-0 and won the title, the 34 title of Primera Division. On 10 March, in the second game of Copa Libertadores group stage Boca won 3-0 Independiente Medellín. The first match of Copa de la Superliga
was a 4–1 victory over Godoy Cruz. On 17 March 2020, AFA announced the suspension of the tournament.

April
On 28 April 2020 AFA announced the abandonment of the Copa de la Superliga and the culmination of the 2019–20 season in all of its competitions due to the COVID-19 pandemic. CONMEBOL also announced the indefinite suspension of 2020 Copa Libertadores.

Squad

Transfers

Winter

In

Out

Summer

In

Out

Pre-season and friendlies

Winter

Summer

Competitions

Overall

1: The Round of 64 was played in the previous season.
2: The group stage was played in the previous season.
3: The final stages will be played in the next season.

Primera División

League table

Relegation table

Results summary

Results by round

Matches

Copa de la Superliga

Zone A

Results summary

Results by round

Matches

Copa Argentina

Round of 32

2019 Copa Libertadores

Final Stages

Round of 16

Quarterfinals

Semifinals

2020 Copa Libertadores

Group stage

Team statistics

Season Appearances and goals

|-
! colspan="14" style="background:#00009B; color:gold; text-align:center"| Goalkeepers

|-
! colspan="14" style="background:#00009B; color:gold; text-align:center"| Defenders

|-
! colspan="16" style="background:#00009B; color:gold; text-align:center"| Midfielders

|-
! colspan="16" style="background:#00009B; color:gold; text-align:center"| Forwards

|-
! colspan="14" style="background:#00009B; color:gold; text-align:center"| Players who have made an appearance or had a squad number this season, but have left the club

|}

Top scorers

Top assists

Penalties

Clean sheets

Disciplinary record

Notes

References

External links
 Club Atlético Boca Juniors official web site 

Club Atlético Boca Juniors seasons
Boca Juniors